Loren William Crabtree (born September 2, 1940) is an American academic. He was the chancellor of the University of Tennessee Knoxville from 2003 to 2008. A historian, he earned his B.A., M.A., and Ph.D. degrees from the University of Minnesota.

References

Living people
1940 births
People from Aberdeen, South Dakota
University of Tennessee faculty
University of Minnesota College of Liberal Arts alumni